Heungkong Group Limited is a Hong Kong conglomerate. Its businesses include retail and manufacture of furniture, logistics, real estate development, property management, natural resources, education, healthcare, and finance services.The group is headquartered in Hong Kong, Guangzhou and Qianhai, Shenzhen.

Heungkong Group was founded in 1990 as a furniture retailer. As its furniture business grows, Heungkong Group started other businesses and has transformed into a conglomerate. In 1996, the Heungkong Group became one of the very first Chinese private enterprises to tap into financial investments and strategically invested in many financial institutions. It is a major shareholder of China Guangfa Bank, GF Securities, GF Fund Management, Guangdong Nanyue Bank and Bank of Tianjin.

Heungkong Group's subsidiaries include Qianhai Heungkong Financial Holdings Group, Heungkong Wanji Aluminum Co., Ltd., 
Shenzhen HeungKong Holding Co., Ltd., and many more. In 2005, Heungkong Charitable Foundation was established, becoming the first national-level foundation founded by private sector in China. Cofounder Zhai Meiqing received the Carnegie Medal of Philanthropy in 2017.

References
Heungkong Group's official website 
BBC: Zhai Meiqing at the forefront of Chinese philanthropy 
Liu Zhiqiang & family - Forbes.com 
China Businesswoman Receives Carnegie Philanthropy Medal in New York 
Medal of Philanthropy 

Conglomerate companies of China